is a ward of Kitakyūshū, Fukuoka, Japan. It is the southern part of what used to be Kokura City, which was merged into Kitakyūshū city when the latter was created out of the merger of five cities in 1963. At this time Kokura was divided into North and South wards.

Kokuraminami ward is mainly rural and undeveloped, and includes the Hiraodai karst plateau and Sugao no taki (waterfall). However, it also includes the present airport and the airport buildings of the new Kitakyūshū Airport, and Shimosone shopping mall.

Population (2000 national census): 213,741
Area: 170.25 km² (includes northern part of the new airport island)

Economy
StarFlyer has its headquarters on the grounds of Kitakyūshū Airport in Kokuraminami-ku.

Tourist attractions
 Hiraodai Nature Observation Center

See also

 Kokura Airport, formerly known as Kitakyushu airport
 New Kitakyushu Airport
 Akiyoshi plateau in nearby Yamaguchi prefecture

References

External links

Kokura Minami ward office official website 

Wards of Kitakyushu